Peptidiphaga gingivicola is a Gram-positive species of bacteria from the family Actinomycetaceae which has been isolated from subgingival plaque.

References

Actinomycetales
Monotypic bacteria genera
Bacteria described in 2021